The Bischler–Napieralski reaction is an intramolecular electrophilic aromatic substitution reaction that allows for the cyclization of β-arylethylamides or β-arylethylcarbamates. The reaction is most notably used in the synthesis of dihydroisoquinolines, which can be subsequently oxidized to isoquinolines.

Mechanisms
Two types of mechanisms have appeared in the literature for the Bischler–Napieralski reaction. Mechanism I involves a dichlorophosphoryl imine-ester intermediate, while Mechanism II involves a nitrilium ion intermediate (both shown in brackets). This mechanistic variance stems from the ambiguity over the timing for the elimination of the carbonyl oxygen in the starting amide.

In Mechanism I, the elimination occurs with imine formation after cyclization; while in Mechanism II, the elimination yields the nitrilium intermediate prior to cyclization. Currently, it is believed that reaction conditions affect the prevalence of one mechanism over the other (see reaction conditions).

In certain literature, Mechanism II is augmented with the formation of an imidoyl chloride intermediate produced by the substitution of chloride for the Lewis acid group just prior to the nitrilium ion.
Because the dihydroisoquinoline nitrogen is basic, neutralization is necessary to obtain the deprotonated product.

General reaction reagents and conditions

The Bischler–Napieralski reaction is carried out in refluxing acidic conditions and requires a dehydrating agent. Phosphoryl chloride (POCl3) is widely used and cited for this purpose. Additionally, SnCl4 and BF3 etherate have been used with phenethylamides, while Tf2O and polyphosphoric acid (PPA) have been used with phenethylcarbamates. For reactants lacking electron-donating groups on the benzene ring, phosphorus pentoxide (P2O5) in refluxing POCl3 is most effective. Depending on the dehydrating reagent used, the reaction temperature varies from room temperature to 100 °C.

Related reactions

Several reactions that are related to the Bischler–Napieralski reaction are known. In the Morgan–Walls reaction, the linker between the aromatic ring and the amide nitrogen is an ortho-substituted aromatic ring. This N-acyl 2-aminobiphenyl cyclizes to form a phenanthridine. The Pictet–Spengler reaction proceeds from a β-arylamine via condensation with an aldehyde. These two components form an imine, which then cyclizes to form a tetrahydroisoquinoline.

Pictet–Gams reaction
The Pictet–Gams reaction proceeds from an β-hydroxy-β-phenethylamide. It involves an additional dehydration under the same conditions as the cyclization, giving an isoquinoline. As with the Bischler–Napieralski reaction, the Pictet–Gams reaction requires a strongly dehydrating Lewis acid, such as phosphoryl chloride or phosphorus pentoxide.

Structural effects and alternate products 
There are documented variations on the Bischler–Napieralski reaction whose products differ in virtue of either the structure of the initial reactant, the tailoring of reaction conditions, or both. For example, research done by Doi and colleagues suggests that the presence or absence of electron-donating groups on the aryl portion of β-arylethylamides and the ratio of dehydrating reagents influence the patterns of ring closure via electrophilic aromatic substitution, leading to two possible products (see below). Other research on the variations on the Bischler-Napieralski Reaction have investigated the effects of nitro and acetal aryl groups on product formation (see references).

See also
Pomeranz–Fritsch reaction

References

 

Nitrogen heterocycle forming reactions
Heterocycle forming reactions
Name reactions